Thomas McLean House is a historic home in Battenville, New York, United States.  It was built between about 1795 and 1867 and consists of a five-bay, two-story main block with two -story wings.  Also on the property are two timber-frame barns, a 1-story commercial building, shed, and remains of a stone foundation. It is located across from the Stoops Hotel.

It was listed on the National Register of Historic Places in 2007.

References

Federal architecture in New York (state)
Houses completed in 1867
Houses in Washington County, New York
Houses on the National Register of Historic Places in New York (state)
National Register of Historic Places in Washington County, New York